Boarding Pass is a Philippine television informative show. The show focuses on immigration, finance, employment, and other concerns of Filipinos abroad. Hosted by Mike Templo, it premiered on January 25, 2014.

Segments
On Board - Atty. Mike Templo tackles immigration concerns and provides answers with the help of Atty. Rio and Atty. Tsui.
Balikbayan Box - features stories of Filipinos who have been successful because of, or in their work abroad.
Sikap Pinoy - features investment and business education tips for OFWs and their families.
Happy Trip - features travel and leisure destinations that OFW families can enjoy.

External links
Boarding Pass website

References

2014 Philippine television series debuts
Filipino-language television shows
GMA News TV original programming